"Golden Oldie" is a song written by Brian and Brenda Russell and performed by Anne Murray. The song reached #18 on both the Canadian Country chart and the Canadian Adult Contemporary chart in 1976.  The song appeared on her 1976 album, Keeping in Touch.  The song was produced by Tom Catalano.

Chart performance

Anne Murray

References

1976 singles
Songs written by Brenda Russell
Anne Murray songs
Capitol Records singles
1976 songs
Song recordings produced by Tom Catalano